Mersin İdmanyurdu (also Mersin İdman Yurdu, Mersin İY, or MİY) Sports Club; located in Mersin, east Mediterranean coast of Turkey in 1971–72. The 1971–72 season was the fifth season of Mersin İdmanyurdu (MİY) football team in Turkish First Football League, the first level division in Turkey. They finished seventh in the league.

Club address was: Bahçelievler, Silifke Caddesi, Mersin. Tel: 1321. Executive committee: Mehmet Karamehmet (president), Ünal Sakman, Emin Yıldız, Orhan Sesimutlu, Erol Tarhan, Güneş Topsal, Çetin Kocaer, Sezai Sak, İbrahim Günay, Aydın Özlü, Özcan Özgürmen, Kayhan Oktar, M. Sözmen, C. Baydur, M. Şahin.

Vice-presidents Erol Tarhan and Mahir Turhan called former coach Turgay Şeren back to club but they could not agree. Mersin İdmanyurdu signed a contract with a foreign manager for the first time in its history, Dumitru Teodorescu. Club executives Orhan Mutlu and Sezai Sak signed former Beşiktaş coach in İstanbul. However, because MİY couldn't obtain a work permit for Teodorescu from Romanian Football Federation, they signed with Turgay Şeren after the second round. Turgay Şeren completed the season.

Pre-season
MİY opened the season on 16.07.1971 with a ceremony in Tevfik Sırrı Gür Stadium.
 04.08.1971 - MİY-Tarsus İdmanyurdu: 6–0. Tarsus. Ayhan 8', Zeki 42'(P), Halit 60', Ayhan 65', Mustafa 74'(P), Zeki 89'.
 11.08.1971 - MİY-Adana Demirspor: 2–1. 14:30. Tevfik Sırrı Gür Stadium, Mersin. "Anatolian Cup" game.
 MİY-Adana Demirspor: 1–0.
 17.08.1971 - Fenerbahçe-MİY: 4–1. Tuesday, 20:00. Mithatpaşa Stadium, İstanbul. Referees: Hilmi Ok, Engil Türkdil, Tuncay Sözer. Fenerbahçe: Datcu, Niyazi, Levent, Ercan (K.Yaşar), serkan, Ostojiç, Fuat, Cevher (Yılmaz), Yaşar, Osman, Şükrü. Goals: Ostojiç 12', Osman 33', Fuat 43', Osman 89'. MİY: Fikret, Halit, Cihat (Güvenir), B.Erol, Akın, Ayhan (Erol), Mustafa, Güray, Ömer (Muhlis), Zeki, Güvenç. Goal: Güvenç 85'. Game played to complete the Zeki-Osman exchange contract.
 20.08.1971 - Kayserispor-MİY: 2–1.

1971–72 First League participation
First League was played with 16 teams in its 15th season, 1971–72. Last two teams relegated to Second League 1972–73. Mersin İY became 7th with 10 wins. Before the season, team's most scorer player Osman Arpacıoğlu was transferred to Fenerbahçe; in return Zeki Temizer from Fenerbahçe and Güvenç Kurtar from Beşiktaş were transferred to Mersin İY. In that season most scorer players were Güvenç Kurtar (12 goals) and Zeki Temizer (8 goals).

Results summary
Mersin İdmanyurdu (MİY) 1971–72 First League summary:

Sources: 1971–72 Turkish First Football League pages.

League table
Mersin İY's league performance in First League in 1971–72 season is shown in the following table.

Note: Won, drawn and lost points are 2, 1 and 0. F belongs to MİY and A belongs to corresponding team for both home and away matches.

Results by round
Results of games MİY played in 1971–72 First League by rounds:

First half

Second half

1971–72 Turkish Cup participation
1971–72  Turkish Cup was played for the 10th season as Türkiye Kupası by 26 teams. Two elimination rounds and finals were played in two-legs elimination system. Top ten first division teams from previous season participated. Mersin İdmanyurdu did not participate in the Cup because they had finished previous season at 11th place. MKE Ankaragücü won the Cup for the first time.

Management

Club management
Mehmet Karamehmet was club president.

Coaching team

1971–72 Mersin İdmanyurdu head coaches:

Note: Only official games were included.

1971–72 squad
Stats are counted for 1971–72 First League matches. In the team rosters five substitutes were allowed to appear, two of whom were substitutable. Only the players who appeared in game rosters were included and listed in the order of appearance.

Sources: 1971–72 season squad data from maçkolik com, Milliyet, and Erbil (1975).

News from Milliyet:
 After the season Cihat Erbil (28) has cancered. The club has started a fund drive for the player. 
 Transfers in: Zeki has come from Fenerbahçe in exchange for Osman. Güray, Güvenç and Halit were transferred from Beşiktaş; and Ömer from Ankaragücü. Velkoviç loaned from Adanaspor. Güvenir from Trabzonspor. Selahattin and İbrahim from İçelspor. Turgay and Erol from Aksarayspor. Mehmet from Tayfun.
 Transfers out: Mustafa Yürür (Kasımpaşa). Necmi (Vefa). Ekrem (Hatayspor).

See also
 Football in Turkey
 1971–72 Turkish First Football League
 1971–72 Turkish Cup

Notes and references

Mersin İdman Yurdu seasons
Turkish football clubs 1971–72 season